Robert Gourd (1933 – March 22, 2015) was a Liberal party member of the House of Commons of Canada. He was a manufacturer and administrator by career.

Gourd was born in Amos, Quebec.  He won the Argenteuil electoral district in the 1979 federal election and was re-elected there in the 1980 election. He was defeated in the 1984 election by Lise Bourgault of the Progressive Conservative party.

He served in various business capacities after his departure from national politics and was a Commissioner on the International Joint Commission which supports the International Boundary Waters Treaty between Canada and the United States. He died in Montreal on March 22, 2015.

References

1933 births
2015 deaths
Members of the House of Commons of Canada from Quebec
Liberal Party of Canada MPs
People from Amos, Quebec